Franz Hammerl (9 October 1919 – August 2001) was a German international footballer.

References

1919 births
2001 deaths
Association football midfielders
German footballers
Germany international footballers